Gregra is a closed railway station on the Broken Hill railway line in New South Wales, Australia. The station opened in 1893 and closed to passenger services in 1974. Only remains of the platform are now visible at the site.

References

Disused regional railway stations in New South Wales
Railway stations in Australia opened in 1893
Railway stations closed in 1974